What does not kill me makes me stronger is part of aphorism number 8 from the "Maxims and Arrows" section of Friedrich Nietzsche's Twilight of the Idols (1888).

It is quoted or alluded to by many other works, with minor variants in wording:

Music

Albums

 If It Don't Kill You, It Just Makes You Stronger, a 1989 album by Bruce Willis
 What Doesn't Kill You... (Candiria album), 2004
 Ono što te ne ubije, to te osakati ('The thing that does not kill you, makes you stultified'), a 2004 album by Goribor
 What Doesn't Kill You... (Blue Cheer album), 2007
 What Doesn't Kill Us, a 2008 album by What Made Milwaukee Famous
 What Doesn't Kill Me... (Ektomorf album), 2009
 What Doesn't Kill Me... (Young Sid album), a 2010 album by Young Sid
 What Doesn't Kill You, Eventually Kills You, a 2011 album by Gay for Johnny Depp

Songs (including notable lyrics)

 "O,ti De Skotonei" ("Ό,τι δε σε σκοτώνει"), a 1991 song by Nikos Portokaloglou on the album Siko Psychi mou, Siko Chorepse
 "Stronger" (Kanye West song), a 2007 song ("...that that don't kill me / can only make me stronger")
 "What Doesn't Kill You", a 2009 song by Takida on the album ...Make You Breathe
 "Stronger (What Doesn't Kill You)", a 2011 song by Kelly Clarkson, originally titled "What Doesn't Kill You (Stronger)")
 "What Doesn't Kill You" (Jake Bugg song), a 2013 song by Jake Bugg
"Not Gonna Die", a 2013 song by Skillet from the album Rise ("What doesn't kill me makes me stronger")
"Doesn't Kill You", a 2016 song by The Anchoress on the album Confessions of a Romance Novelist
"You Ain't Ready", a 2019 song by Skillet from the album Victorious ("What doesn't kill me makes me who I am")
"Only God Can Judge Me", a 1996 song by 2Pac on the album All Eyez On Me

Other uses
 What Doesn't Kill You (film), a 2008 American crime drama by Brian Goodman
 What Doesn't Kill You, is a 2012 spy novel by Iris Johansen